James Knox Sturgeon (5 November 1844 – 19 August 1899) was a private of the United States Army who was awarded the Medal of Honor for gallantry during the American Civil War. He was awarded the medal on 2 January 1895 for actions performed at the Battle of Kenesaw Mountain on 15 June 1864.

Personal life 
Sturgeon was born on 5 November 1844 in Perry County, Ohio to parents James Sturgeon and Esther Radabaugh. He was one of 5 children. He married Minerva Jane Miller and fathered three children. He died on 19 August 1899 in Los Angeles, California and was buried in Evergreen Cemetery in Los Angeles.

Military service 
Sturgeon enlisted in the Army as a private on 9 December 1861 in Lancaster, Ohio and was assigned to Company F of the 46th Ohio Infantry on 16 December 1861.

On 15 June 1864, at the Battle of Kenesaw Mountain in Georgia, the 46th Ohio, along with other Union units, was ordered to assault a well-defended Confederate position a few miles north of the town of Marietta, Georgia. According to Sturgeon, the Confederates scattered during the initial Union charge and much of his regiment was tied up processing those who had surrendered. Sturgeon, along with three other men, rounded up the Confederates who had fled, eventually capturing nearly 30 prisoners.

Sturgeon's Medal of Honor citation reads:

Sturgeon was later wounded in the left forearm at Jonesboro, Georgia on 31 August 1864 and was eventually discharged for wounds on 18 May 1865 at Louisville, Kentucky.

References 

United States Army Medal of Honor recipients
American Civil War recipients of the Medal of Honor
1844 births
1899 deaths
Burials at Evergreen Cemetery, Los Angeles
People from Perry County, Ohio
People from Los Angeles